Bomso is a town in Ghana. It is 10 kilometres from the centre  Kumasi. It is a dormitory town. Bomso is unofficially divided into three parts namely Bomso (Panin) meaning elder or senior and Bomso ketiwa (small) and Bomso Susuanso. Apart from being a residential areas for workers in various companies in Kumasi, many hostels are available to serve the students from the Kwame Nkrumah University of Science and Technology. There are churches and school namely Church of Pentecost, Baptist Church, Bomso Government school, St. Francis preparatory school, America Dream Educational Centre(AMDEC), Christian Preparatory School and others.

Boundaries 
The town is bordered on the north by Maxima, to the West by Ayigya, to the east by Asokore Mampong and to the South by Kentinkrono.

Notable places
Bomso clinic is a private health facility in the community which offers various medical and specialist services to patients. Ultimate hostel also known as Evandy hostel is one of the most popular landmarks at Bomso.

References

Populated places in Kumasi Metropolitan Assembly